Iowa Highway 56 (Iowa 56) is a state highway that runs from west to east in northeastern Iowa.  It begins at Iowa Highway 150 in West Union and ends at Iowa Highway 13 south of Elkader.  As a largely rural route, Iowa 56 passes through the farmland of Fayette and Clayton counties.  Through Elkader and to its eastern end, the highway runs parallel to the Turkey River.

The  highway is an original route from 1920.  It originally extended from West Union to Guttenberg, but it was shortened to Elkader by 1925.  Since then, both the western and eastern endpoints have shifted slightly, but the route otherwise remains the same.

Route description
Iowa Highway 56 begins at an intersection with Iowa 150 in the southern part of West Union. The route starts out heading to the east, but turns to the south as it leaves the city limits. Being a largely rural route, it passes through the rolling farmland of Fayette and Clayton counties.

It continues to the south-southeast until it nears Elkader.  There, it briefly turns to the northeast before turning southeast again along Second Street parallel to the Turkey River.  The street plan of Elkader was influenced by the river, which flows from the northwest to southeast through town.  Iowa 56 follows Bridge Street for one block; it heads to the southeast again along First Street.  The highway meanders to the south, following the river, to an intersection with Iowa 13 near where that highway crosses the Turkey River.  Clayton County's Turkey River Park is located at the intersection of Iowa 13 and Iowa 56.

History

When the Iowa primary highway system was created in 1920, Primary Road No. 56 extended from West Union eastward to Guttenberg.  It began in a different location in West Union than it does today, beginning at Primary Road No. 19 in the northeastern part of town.  The route then headed south along Pine Street.  In Elkader, Primary Road No. 56 joined Primary Roads No. 10 and No. 13 and crossed the Turkey River on the Keystone Bridge.  Shortly after leaving Elkader, Primary Road No. 56 split away from the other two routes and headed east.  It turned south at Primary Road No. 20 and the two routes headed to Guttenberg.  The Primary Road No. 56 designation ended in Guttenberg.

Primary Road No. 56's length past Elkader did not last long.  By 1925, the two overlaps were removed and the standalone stretch between them was renumbered Primary Road. No. 128.  By the 1950s, the western end of the route shifted to its current position in West Union.  In the early 1980s, a new bypass and Turkey River bridge were built around Elkader.  Iowa 13 was shifted onto the bypass and Iowa 56 was extended southward along the former Iowa 13 to the new highway.  In 2004, the two intersections of Iowa 56 along Bridge Street were rebuilt to allow large trucks to take the sharp turns.  Roadwork began on June 1 and the street reopened on August 4.

Major intersections

References

056